Caton-with-Littledale is a civil parish in Lancaster, Lancashire, England. It contains 53 listed buildings that are recorded in the National Heritage List for England. Of these, two are listed at Grade II*, the middle grade, and the others are at Grade II.  The parish contains the villages and smaller settlements of Caton, Brookhouse, Littledale, Caton Green, and Crossgill.  It is otherwise rural, with a number of isolated farms.  Many of the listed buildings are houses and associated structures in the settlements and in the surrounding countryside.  The other listed buildings include a church, disused chapels, a cross base, bridges, two former mills, and two milestones.

Key

Buildings

References

Citations

Sources

Lists of listed buildings in Lancashire
Buildings and structures in the City of Lancaster